Robert D. Biggs was Professor of Assyriology in the Department of Near Eastern Languages and Civilizations at the University of Chicago. He received his PhD at Johns Hopkins University in 1962. He was an editor of the Journal of Near Eastern Studies. He retired from the University of Chicago in June 2004.

See also
Simo Parpola
H. W. F. Saggs

References

External links
Faculty page at the University of Chicago Department of Near Eastern Languages & Civilisations. Archived from the original 30 August 2006
Interview with Robert Biggs for the Oriental Institute Oral History Project

American Assyriologists
Living people
1934 births
Johns Hopkins University alumni

Assyriologists